Jacob Sanchez (born August 19, 1989) is a Mexican-American professional baseball pitcher in the San Diego Padres organization.

Career

Early years
Sanchez attended Brawley Union High School in Brawley, California, Imperial Valley College, and Iowa Wesleyan University. He was not drafted by a Major League Baseball organization out of college in 2012. He pitched in independent league baseball, playing in the Liga Norte de México and for the Joliet Slammers of the Frontier League.

Chicago White Sox
On June 10, 2013, Sanchez signed a minor league contract with the Chicago White Sox organization. Sanchez pitched for the Great Falls Voyagers of the Rookie-level Pioneer League, and was named the league's pitcher of the year. In 2014, Sanchez began the season with the Kannapolis Intimidators of the Class A South Atlantic League.

Oakland Athletics
On June 14, 2014, the Oakland Athletics traded Michael Taylor for Sanchez, and they assigned him to the Stockton Ports of the High-A California League. In 2015, he pitched for the Midland RockHounds of the Double-A Texas League. He pitched for the Águilas de Mexicali of the Liga Mexicana del Pacífico in 2016–17, also pitching for them in the 2017 Caribbean Series. Sanchez was released by the Athletics organization on August 2, 2018.

Toros de Tijuana
On August 6, 2018, Sanchez signed with the Toros de Tijuana of the Mexican League. He appeared in 13 games for Tijuana to close out the year, registering a 1–1 record and 4.61 ERA with 8 strikeouts in 13.2 innings pitched. In 2019, he pitched in 36 games for Tijuana, logging a 3–3 record and 4.50 ERA with 42 strikeouts and 13 saves in 38.0 innings of work. 

Sanchez did not play in a game in 2020 due to the cancellation of the Mexican League season because of the COVID-19 pandemic. In 2021, Sanchez made 27 appearances for the Toros, working to a 1–1 record and 2.93 ERA with 31 strikeouts in 27.2 innings pitched.

Sultanes de Monterrey
On September 27, 2021, Sanchez, along with IF Daniel Castro and C Victor Ortega, were traded to the Sultanes de Monterrey of the Mexican League. He made 45 appearances for Monterrey in 2022, but struggled to a 7–4 record and 6.05 ERA with 43 strikeouts in 41.2 innings pitched.

San Diego Padres
On February 3, 2023, Sanchez signed a minor league contract with the San Diego Padres organization.

International career
Sanchez played for the Mexican national baseball team at the 2017 World Baseball Classic, 2019 exhibition games against Japan, and the 2023 World Baseball Classic.

Personal life
Sanchez holds dual American and Mexican citizenship.

References

External links

1989 births
Living people
Águilas de Mexicali players
American baseball players of Mexican descent
Baseball players from California
Iowa Wesleyan Tigers baseball
Joliet JackHammers players
Great Falls Voyagers players
Kannapolis Intimidators players
Mexican baseball players
Mexican League baseball pitchers
Midland RockHounds players
Nashville Sounds players
People from Brawley, California
Stockton Ports players
Toros de Tijuana players
2017 World Baseball Classic players
2023 World Baseball Classic players